HMS Nordland was a salvage vessel that was built in 1922 as the German fishing trawler Nordland. She was requisitioned by the Kriegsmarine in 1939 but was returned to merchant service. She was captured by the Royal Navy in 1940 and taken in to service. Sold in 1948, she was used as a sludge carrier under the name Tulipfield. She was scrapped in 1965.

Description
The engine was built by Reiherstieg Schiffswerfte & Maschinenfabrik, Hamburg, Germany.

History
Nordland was built in 1922 as yard number 543 by Reiherstieg Schiffswerfte & Maschinenfabrik for the Deutsche Seefischerei. She was launced on 3 October and completed on 5 December. The fishing boat registration HC 105 was allocated. In 1934, her Code Letters were changed to DHRW. On 21 March 1937, she was sold to the Nordsee Deutsche Hochseefischerei Bremen-Cuxhaven AG, Cuxhaven. By 1930, the Code Letters RDCG were allocated. On 21 February 1932, Nordland was driven ashore at "Leiknes Gisund", Norway. She was refloated the next day with assistance from the German trawlers  and Lappland.

On 4 September 1939, Nordland was requisitioned by the Kriegsmarine for use as a vorpostenboot. She was allocated to 4 Vorpostenflotille as V 401 Nordland, but was redesignated V 411 Nordland three days later, but was released from service. She returned to use as a fishing trawler, with the registration PG 105. Nordland was one of three German trawlers captured about this time, the others being Blankenberg and Friesland. She was commissioned as HMS Nordland, and was used as a salvage vessel.

In 1948, HMS Nordland was sold to the British Wheeler Process Ltd, Liverpool, Lancashire, United Kingdom. Her port of registry was Liverpool. The United Kingdom Official Number 167703 and Code Letters MLZR were allocated. British Wheeler Process Ltd. was a company specialising in the cleaning of ships' tanks. Tulipfield was fitted with three tanks for the carrying of petroleum sludge. She was permitted to sail between British ports only. She was scrapped in October 1965 by de Smedt, Antwerp, Belgium.

References

Sources

External links
Photograph of Tulipfield

1922 ships
Ships built in Hamburg
Fishing vessels of Germany
Steamships of Germany
Maritime incidents in 1932
Auxiliary ships of the Kriegsmarine
World War II merchant ships of Germany
Auxiliary ships of the Royal Navy
Steamships of the United Kingdom
Merchant ships of the United Kingdom